The Negro American Association was the name of two different minor league Negro baseball leagues.

Negro American Association (1939) 
The first Negro American Association was organized in 1939, lasting one season.  This league was to be a farm system for major league-caliber Negro league teams during the years of segregated baseball, but was not profitable.

Teams (1939) 

Camden Giants
Richmond Hilldales
Baltimore Black Sox
Philadelphia Meteors
Greensboro Redwings
Winston-Salem Giants
High Point (NC) Red Sox

Negro American Association (1948–1949) 
Another Negro American Association was organized in 1948, lasting two seasons. This league was formed after the integration of Major League Baseball and was meant to rival the existing Negro American League. 

Included in the founding 12 teams were four established teams from the Negro Southern League (NSL), including the steadfast Atlanta Black Crackers, and another five teams from a new league, the Negro Carolina League (NCL).  

After the collapse of the Negro National League (NNL) in 1948, the three-time Negro World Series champion Homestead Grays joined the league and crushed the competition.  The league folded after the 1949 season.

Teams (1948–1949) 

Atlanta Black Crackers (1948–1949) — from NSL
Greensboro Red Wings (1948–1949) — from NCL
Raleigh Tigers (1948–1949) — from NSL
Richmond Giants (1948–1949) — from NCL
Winston-Salem Pond Giants (1948–1949) — from NCL
Asheville Blues (1948) — from NSL
Durham Eagles (1948) — from NCL
Jacksonville Eagles (1948) — from NSL
Norfolk-Newport News (1948)
Orangeburg, SC (1948)
Baltimore Panthers (1948) — Dropped out before season end
Danville All Stars (1948) — from NCL; Dropped out before season end
Charlotte Blues (1949)
Homestead Grays (1949) — from NNL

League champions 

1948 Raleigh defeated Asheville 4g-2g
1949 Homestead overpowered the rest of the league in the 1st half, no 2nd half reported

References

External links 

Center for Negro League Research

Negro baseball leagues
Defunct baseball leagues in the United States
Sports leagues established in 1939
Sports leagues established in 1948